Skálavík is a village and municipality on the eastern coast of the Faroese island Sandoy.

History
The village's stone church was built in 1891. The famous Faroese writers Heðin Brú (born Hans Jacob Jacobsen) (1901–1987) and Kristian Osvald Viderø (1906–1988) were both born in Skálavík.

In late January 2008 Skálavík was hit by a strong hurricane. The port was destroyed, along with many boats and houses. The damage was so great that emergency aid was provided from Iceland.

Depilin í Skálavík - Hotel Skálavík

In May 2011 a new center opened in Skálavík. It was donated by shipowner Eiler Jacobsen (1930-2010), who was born in the village. He did not live to see the opening, but he visited the building during the construction. There is a restaurant, a hotel and conference center, activities for children etc. The center was named Skeiðs- og frítíðardepilin Immanuel, but they also use the name "Depilin í Skálavík" (The Center in Skálavík). It was named Immanuel after the ship by the same name in which Eiler Jacobsen's father went missing in 1932.

On 23 March 2015 Smyril Line took over the operation of the hotel, and at the same time the name was changed to Hotel Skálavík. The hotel had 25 room at the time.

See also
List of towns in the Faroe Islands

Gallery

References

External links

Depil.fo (Depilin í Skálavík (Skeiðs- og frítíðardepilin Immanuel), a holiday and conference center, built in 2010-2011.
The Tourist Information Center of Sandoy
Danish site with photographs of Skálavík

Populated places in the Faroe Islands
Municipalities of the Faroe Islands
Sandoy